Lynn Forney Young was the 43rd President General of the Daughters of the American Revolution and a member of the U.S. Semiquincentennial Commission.

Personal life
A native of Texas, Young lives on a cattle ranch in Milam County, Texas with her husband. They have two children and three grandchildren. She is a member of a variety of historical and lineage societies.

DAR membership

Young joined the Daughters of the American Revolution in the 1980s and has served many roles, from Regent of the Tejas Chapter to President General.  Elected PG in 2013, she was the first DAR member from Texas to hold the office.  The symbol of her administration was the "majestic eagle." Her administration's theme was “Honoring Our Heritage—Focusing on the Future—Celebrating America!,” commonly shortened to "Celebrate America!," and focused the DAR's role as a service organization.  She encouraged Chapters and Members to celebrate the 125th anniversary of the NSDAR in 2015 and participate in the new Celebrate America! Committee, which focused on meaningful public service.  She asked members to log one million service hours and ultimately 14 million hours were logged.  Her term coincided with the 125th anniversary of the DAR in 2015.  

Highlights from Young's Administration:
 Celebrated the DAR's 125th Anniversary.
 The highest yearly total of new members in the National Society’s history in 2013: 13,906.
 Initiated the National DAR Day of Service.
 Members logged over 14.5 million service hours during the Young administration.
 Set Guinness World Record for "Most letters to military personnel collected in one month" by collecting 100,904 letters.
 Created the Sustaining Supporter Program, the Daughters Tribute, and the Guardian Trust Endowment Fund.
 Facility upgrades at Constitution Hall, including a cooling tower and chilled water pumping/distribution system, as well as the installation of a solar energy array. 
 Over $4 Million in the historic preservation and restoration of Constitution Hall's 475-foot-long lobby, the President General’s Reception Room, replacement of window sills in the Banquet Hall, exterior masonry work, carpet replacement, and gutter repair. 
 Technological advances including a new DAR website, installation of fiber optic cable to improve internet access and programming, new computers that doubled the capacity of the Seimes Technology Center, initiation of an electronic application, and upgrades in management software for the NSDAR Archives and Americana Collection.
 Met with Queen Elizabeth II on 1 April 2015 during an event to launch a project to digitize the Royal Archives of King George III.

U.S. Semiquincentennial Commission

Young was appointed to the Commission in June 2016 by Speaker of the House Paul Ryan, as one of 16 private citizens appointed. She will serve, in part, as a liaison between the more than 950,000 DAR members who are commemorating the U.S. Semiquincentennial through the DAR's pre-existing America 250! Committee.  Young stated, “We look forward to celebrating our nation’s incredible history and fostering a renewed appreciation for all of the Americans who founded our nation and ensured its progress through the generations.”

Other associations
 Milam County Historical Commission
 El Camino Real de los Tejas National Historic Trail Association
 United Daughters of the Confederacy
 Colonial Dames of America, Chapter VIII
 Daughters of the Republic of Texas
 National Society Daughters of the American Colonists
 National Society United States Daughters of 1812
 National Society Colonial Dames XVII Century
 Delta Zeta

References

Living people
Year of birth missing (living people)
21st-century American women
Colonial Dames of America
Daughters of the American Revolution people
Members of the United Daughters of the Confederacy
People from Milam County, Texas